Purna Shova Chitrakar is the Nepalese founder of Ban Landmines Campaign Nepal (NCBL), and recipient of the N-Peace Award in 2011.

In 1995 Chitrakar founded Ban Landmines Campaign Nepal (NCBL) to  ban on the use, production, transfer and stockpile of landmines. She is the author of the paper Mine-risk Education in Nepal, 2009. In 2011 Chitrakar was one of inaugural recipients of the N-Peace Award. The same year Nepal was declared free of landmine fields.

References

Living people
Date of birth missing (living people)
20th-century Nepalese women
21st-century Nepalese women
Nepalese women activists
Year of birth missing (living people)